Jo Jin-kyu (born 1960) is a South Korean film director. Jo's directorial debut was the hit gangster comedy My Wife Is a Gangster (2001). He returned to the series with My Wife Is a Gangster 3 in 2006. In 2016, he directed a joint Korean-Chinese film Sweet Sixteen (2016) starring Joo Won.

Filmography

Film 
Agada (1984) - script editor
Good Morning, Ms. President (1989) - assistant director 
My Wife Is a Gangster (2001) - director
Who's Got the Tape? (2004) - director
My Wife Is a Gangster 3 (2006) - director
Man on the Edge  (2013) - director, executive producer
Sweet Sixteen (2016) - director

Television 
Bolder By the Day (MBN, 2011–2012)

References

External links 
 
 
 

1960 births
Living people
South Korean film directors